Byron Stewart Dinkins (born June 15, 1967) is a former American professional basketball player, who played two seasons in the NBA, from 1989 to 1991. He played college basketball for UNC Charlotte. After his stint in the NBA, Dinkins pursued a professional career in Greece.

College career
Dinkins, a 6'1" (1.85 m) tall point guard, that was born in Charlotte, North Carolina, attended and graduated from East Mecklenburg, where he played high school basketball. After high school, Dinkins was recruited to play college basketball by UNC Charlotte. He stayed with the Charlotte 49ers for four seasons, as he averaged 15.5 points per game, 2.8 rebounds per game, 4.8 assists per game, and 1.2 steals per game, in 107 games played. 

Dinkins achieved a career-high in scoring, during his junior season, as he averaged 21.4 points per game. Dinkins led his school to the Sun Belt Conference Tournament title. He was also honored as the Sun Belt Player of the Year. Dinkins was also named to the All-Sun Belt Conference First Team in his junior and senior seasons.

Professional career

NBA
Dinkins played in the NBA, with the Houston Rockets, during the 1989–90 NBA season. He split time with the San Antonio Spurs and Indiana Pacers, during the 1990–91 season. In his NBA career, Dinkins played in a total of 45 games played, and he scored a total of 151 points, for a soring average of 3.4 points per game.

Greece
Although Dinkins never played for an NBA team after 1991, he did have a prosperous professional club basketball career playing in the Greek League for Peristeri Athens, Panionios Athens, Panathinaikos Athens, and Iraklis Thessaloniki. Dinkins led the Greek League in assists per game, in the 1995–96 season. In the 1996–97 season, he played with Panathinaikos, and in September 1996, he helped them win the 1996 edition of the FIBA Intercontinental Cup.

Personal life
After his basketball playing career ended, Dinkins returned to his birthplace of Charlotte, North Carolina. He now serves as the head coach of the Carmel Christian School varsity boys basketball team, and the middle school's gym teacher. Professional basketball player K. C. Rivers, is his nephew.

References

External links
Career stats at basketball-reference.com
Eurobasket.com Profile

1967 births
Living people
African-American basketball players
American expatriate basketball people in Cyprus
American expatriate basketball people in Germany
American expatriate basketball people in Greece
American men's basketball players
Basketball players from Charlotte, North Carolina
Charlotte 49ers men's basketball players
Columbus Horizon players
Greek Basket League players
High school basketball coaches in the United States
Houston Rockets players
Indiana Pacers players
Iraklis Thessaloniki B.C. players
Panathinaikos B.C. players
Panionios B.C. players
Peristeri B.C. players
Point guards
Rapid City Thrillers players
San Antonio Spurs players
Sportspeople from Charlotte, North Carolina
Undrafted National Basketball Association players
21st-century African-American people
20th-century African-American sportspeople